Amy Manford (born 25 December 1993) is an Australian-American soprano. Manford graduated with honours from the Royal College of Music, studying for a Masters in Vocal Performance. She has performed in a number of theatre productions and events around Australia and the globe.

Career  
Some of Manford's career highlights include performing alongside Andrea Bocelli for his Australian tour, starring in Andrew Lloyd Webber's The Phantom of the Opera, singing the Australian national anthem for the 2021 AFL Grand Final in Perth, and singing for members of the UK royal family on multiple occasions.

References 

1993 births
Musicians from Perth, Western Australia
Alumni of the Royal College of Music
Living people